H&B may refer to:

Hillerich & Bradsby, an American sporting goods company
Holland & Barrett, a British health food retailer

See also

 HB (disambiguation)
 HNB (disambiguation)